The Primorsky Range is a range of mountains in Southern Siberia, part of the South Siberian Mountains. Administratively the range belongs to the Irkutsk Oblast, Russian Federation. The settlement of Buguldeyka, Olkhonsky District, is located in the range area.

Geography 
The Primorsky Range stretches northeastwards for about  along the western shore of Lake Baikal from its southern end. It is located in the area of the sources of the Lena and to the north it connects with the Baikal Range, which also stretches along the lakeshore. Its eastern side is made mostly of rocky cliffs descending steeply to the shores of Lake Baikal, opposite Olkhon Island. The western slopes of the range are more gentle and are facing the Lena-Angara Plateau. The range includes highly developed karst forms.

Hydrography
The Primorsky Range acts as a watershed between the rivers of the Lake Baikal and the Angara/Lena basins. Short and fast-flowing rivers have their sources in the range, including the Anga, Bolshaya Buguldeyka, Sarma and Goloustnaya, which flow into Lake Baikal. Also several left tributaries of the Lena, such as the Ilikta and Manzurka, as well as several small right tributaries of the Angara flow from the range.

Flora
The gentler slopes of the range are mainly covered with pine and larch forests and the northern half of the eastern slopes with steppe vegetation. There are bare summits (golets) in the higher elevations.

See also
List of mountains and hills of Russia
Pribaikalsky National Park

References

External links
 Природа Байкала - Приморский хребет (Nature Baikal)
  Baikalo-Lensky Zapovednik - Center for Russian Nature Conservation
Lake Baikal
Landforms of Irkutsk Oblast
Mountain ranges of Russia
South Siberian Mountains

ceb:Primorskiy Khrebet (kabukiran sa Rusya, Irkutskaya Oblast')
ru:Приморский хребет